Exoristoides is a genus of bristle flies in the family Tachinidae. There are five described species in Exoristoides.

Species
These five species belong to the genus Exoristoides:
 Exoristoides blattarius O'Hara, 2002 i c g b
 Exoristoides homoeonychioides (Townsend, 1934) c g
 Exoristoides johnsoni Coquillett, 1897 i g b
 Exoristoides mixta (Townsend, 1935) c
 Exoristoides sabroskyi O'Hara, 2002 i c g
Data sources: i = ITIS, c = Catalogue of Life, g = GBIF, b = Bugguide.net

References

Further reading

External links

 
 

Tachinidae
Taxa named by Daniel William Coquillett